José do Patrocínio Oliveira (Jundiaí, February 11, 1904 – Los Angeles, December 22, 1987), known by the pseudonym Zé Carioca, was a Brazilian musician and voice actor.

Biography 
Self-taught on musical instruments, Zé Carioca played the guitar, ukulele and banjo. He worked as an employee of the Butantan Institute in São Paulo. In 1931, he went on to perform at the Columbia Orchestra, directed by Odmar Amaral Gurgel conductor at Radio Cruzeiro do Sul. At that time, he exchanged the ukulele by banjo, earning him the nickname Zezinho do Banjo. In 1932, he went to Rio de Janeiro, through César Ladeira, to perform at Radio Mayrink Veiga. At that station, he worked alongside the great composers of that period: Garoto, Pixinguinha, Nélson Souto, among others. When Ladeira became artistic director of the Cassino da Urca, took Zé Carioca to perform at the famous carioca casino. Was where he met Carmen Miranda in 1939.

By the 1940s, Zé Carioca started to work alongside Carmen Miranda together with the Bando da Lua in several movies from 20th Century Fox, initially participated only the soundtrack, and then also in scene. It was at this time that he met Walt Disney, through Aloísio de Oliveira, starting to dub studio cartoon characters. The contact with Disney inspired the American producer to create the character José Carioca, who made his debut in the 1942 film Saludos Amigos, voiced by Zé Carioca and named after him. Oliveira became a celebrity with this film, in which he also performed the song "Tico-Tico no Fubá", and was even more popular after the 1944 film The Three Caballeros, in which he voiced José Carioca again. For some scholars, there was at the time a pact between the US government and Hollywood to produce films of the "Good Neighbor Policy" strategy for the advancement of U.S. influence in Latin America during the presidency Franklin D. Roosevelt.

Oliveira even voiced José Carioca in the Brazilian Portuguese version of Saludos Amigos and The 3 Caballeros. Oliveira had an uncredited appearance in the 1955 movie Hell's Island, and voiced José Carioca again in the Disneyland specials "2 Happy Amigos" (1960) and "Carnival Time" (1962).

By 1947, Zé Carioca with Nestor Amaral, Russo do Pandeiro, Russinho and Laurindo Almeida create together the Carioca Boys. The group participated in the movie Road to Rio starring Bing Crosby and Bob Hope, with the presence of the Andrews Sisters.

See also 

 Zé Carioca

References

External links 
 
 

1904 births
1987 deaths
Brazilian  male  singer-songwriters
Música Popular Brasileira singers
20th-century Brazilian male singers
20th-century Brazilian singers
Brazilian male voice actors